Kinect Sports: Season Two, also known as Kinect Sports 2, is a sequel to Kinect Sports co-developed by Rare and BigPark, and published by Microsoft Studios. It was unveiled at E3 2011's Microsoft Conference for Kinect and released in October 2011. The game adds six new sports and voice control. As with the previous game, it requires the Kinect sensor. Along with its predecessor Kinect Sports, it has been released in the Kinect Sports Ultimate Collection bundle on 18 September 2012 with additional bonus content and extra sports added, basketball, golf and skiing.

Gameplay
Kinect Sports: Season Two consists of six sports which can be accessed from the main menu, which can be played in single or multiplayer: golf, darts, baseball, skiing, tennis, and American football. The games are controlled through Microsoft's Kinect device, which allows players to control the game through gestures and speech recognition without the need of any physical game controller. The player controls the sports by mimicking how the sports are played in real life without the equipment that usually is associated with them; for example, swinging one's arms as if they were holding a golf club or kicking to score a field goal in American football. The Kinect's voice command technology is utilized more frequently than in the game's predecessor, Kinect Sports, with the game containing over 300 voice commands.

Rare has shown the American football game's two-player gameplay, where one user controls the quarterback and another the receiver during a game. The player mimes throwing a football towards the receiver, where the other person mimics catching it. A field goal trial was demonstrated during the Electronic Entertainment Expo (E3), which allowed the user to attempt to kick a field goal by completing a kicking motion. In golf, the player can use voice commands to switch clubs without having to move to a menu, and swing their hands as if holding a club. The game features Xbox Live competition, and allows players to challenge each other in multiplayer modes.

Reception

Microsoft demonstrated golf and American football at E3 2011. Reaction from demos for golf were positive; Tom Hoggins of The Daily Telegraph called the golf game "excellent fun" and stated that the game overall felt like "a highly refined, more complete version of the first game". The American football demonstration was subject to more mixed reaction. IGN's Peter Eykemans complimented the Kinect's sensitivity toward his missed field goal kick, noting that as he accidentally kicked the floor in real life, his avatar likewise failed to hit the football properly in the game. GameSpot's Tom McShea voiced concerns from the E3 demonstration of American football, noticing how the demonstrator's attempts to throw to the receiver in the multiplayer game for the most part failed to work properly.

Music 
Kinect Sports: Season 2 includes 74 soundtracks including popular songs licensed from record labels as well as its own unique theme "Take it Back" composed by British composer Robin Beanland. The main theme, "Take it Back", is played on the main menu as well as in many different remixed forms for each sport's menu.

References

External links
Kinect Sports: Season Two at xbox.com
Kinect Sports: Season Two at Rare

2011 video games
American football video games
Baseball video games
Darts video games
Golf video games
Kinect games
Microsoft games
Multiple-sport video games
Party video games
Rare (company) games
Skiing video games
Tennis video games
Xbox 360 games
Xbox 360-only games
Video games scored by Robin Beanland
Video game sequels
Multiplayer and single-player video games
BAFTA winners (video games)
Video games developed in the United Kingdom